The City of Campbelltown is a local government area in the north eastern suburbs of Adelaide, South Australia about 6 kilometres from the Adelaide GPO. The city is bordered by the River Torrens and the City of Tea Tree Gully, the District of Adelaide Hills, the City of Burnside, the City of Norwood Payneham St Peters, and the City of Port Adelaide Enfield.

History
The first District Council of Payneham in South Australia was formed in 1854 when the year-old District Council of East Torrens was split, for more effective governance, into three separate local governing bodies, including the original East Torrens council and the District Council of Burnside. In 1867 the new District Council of Stepney was detached from Payneham council to better represent the more urban interests of the western wards. In the following year, on 27 February 1868, Payneham was renamed the District Council of Campbelltown. The name "Campbelltown" had been decided upon at a meeting held at the Glynde Inn on 9 December 1867 and was named after Charles James Fox Campbell. The Stepney council was later renamed in the 1930s to the District Council of Payneham, making it the second council of that name.

On 1 January 1946, the Campbelltown District Council became a town with its own municipal office and, on 6 May 1960, it was proclaimed a city.

Lochend
Campbell purchased Sections 309 and 310 on a fertile plain near the River Torrens in 1842 and built a home he called "Lochend" after the ancestral home of his family in Scotland. Lochend was designed by George Strickland Kingston, and built of local river stone. It included a stucco porch, hall and living room with a moulded ceiling. Campbell later substantially expanded Lochend by the addition of three bedrooms and a cellar. In 1849 he subdivided  into 40 gardening blocks under the name "Campbelltown".

In 1852, Campbell leased the house to James Scott. By this time, the house had six rooms. Campbell sold Lochend to Scott in 1858 for 2,600 pounds, and Scott lived there until 1875. The Scott family enlarged the house to eleven rooms, a stable, coach house and cottage, all surrounded by vegetable and fruit gardens and 58 acres of crop growing land. The next owner, retired sheep farmer David Mundy, built the two-storey house Lochiel Park, on a rise just to the south of Lochend. From 1898 to 1957, Lochend and Lochiel Park were owned or lived in by members of the Hobbs family. The Hobbs sold both houses to the South Australian Government in 1947, and Lochiel Park became a junior boys' reformatory.

In the early 1980s, ownership of Lochend was transferred to Campbelltown Council. Empty, partly demolished and isolated, Lochend had deteriorated, was in a dangerous condition, and was in almost irretrievable condition. In 1998 Campbelltown Council began efforts to save the building; it was faithfully restored to near original condition with the guidance of the Campbelltown Historical Society, and was officially reopened on 29 February 2004.

Lochend, also known as Lochend House, is now situated within Lochiel Park. It is a listed building,  as a place of state heritage significance as well as being on the Register of the National Estate. It is owned in trust by the City of Campbelltown, and open to the public for two hours on the first Sunday of every alternate month.

Lochiel Park
Lochiel Park, also known as Lochiel Park Green Village, is a mixed urban development covering . In 2002 the South Australian Government under Premier Mike Rann announced the development of an ecovillage on the site of the Lochiel Park junior boys' reformatory/ TAFE college. It was originally intended to build normal suburban housing on the  site, but Renewal SA proposed an alternative plan, which involved building medium-density housing on only a third of the site. The remaining area was to become public parkland, incorporating and urban forest and wetlands to process the stormwater. The new development was planned to cover an area bounded by the River Torrens (west), Lochend House, grounds and entry road (north), Hobbs House (east), the O-Bahn (south-east), and a wetland (south).  Announcing the development in 2002, Premier Mike Rann said: "I want South Australia to become a world leader in a new green approach to the way we all live. The Lochiel Park Development will become the national model 'Green Village' incorporating ecological sustainable development technologies".

The development began under Renewal SA in 2004; by 2018 there were 106 dwellings at Lochiel Park; and by 2022, 150 residents. All houses have a minimum 7.5-star NatHERS (Nationwide House Energy Rating Scheme) rating, and built with extremely strict energy and water efficiency specifications. It has been described as a "nation-leading 'green village'".

The Lochiel Park Community Garden was established in June 2010, after an inaugural meeting of residents in June 2008, and the first produce was picked in December 2010.

In 2013, South Australia's first zero carbon home was completed at Lochiel Park, built by TS4 Living, whose design won a competition to build a sustainable conventional three-bedroomed home for the same cost as a conventional home.
After completion of the development, Renewal SA handed over responsibility for the maintenance of the urban forest, wetlands and reserves to the counil and SA Water.

In 2019, the village won an international Green Flag Award, the first in SA, and one of only 10 won by Australian sites thus far.

Council

The current council  is:

Suburbs
 Athelstone (5076)
 Campbelltown (5074)
 Hectorville (5073)
 Magill (5072) 
 Newton (5074)
 Paradise (5075)
 Rostrevor (5073)
 Tranmere (5073)

See also
 List of Adelaide parks and gardens

References

External links
City of Campbelltown website
City of Campbelltown community profile

Local government areas of South Australia
Local government areas in Adelaide
1854 establishments in Australia